Abnelis Yambo Miranda (born 10 October 2000) is a Puerto Rican freestyle wrestler. At the 2019 Pan American Games held in Lima, Peru, she won one of the bronze medals in the 62 kg event.

In 2019, she also won one of the bronze medals in the 62 kg event at the Pan American Wrestling Championships held in Buenos Aires, Argentina.

Achievements

Notes

References

External links 
 
 Abnelis Yambo at the 2019 Pan American Games

2000 births
Living people
Place of birth missing (living people)
Puerto Rican female sport wrestlers
Pan American Games medalists in wrestling
Pan American Games bronze medalists for Puerto Rico
Wrestlers at the 2019 Pan American Games
Medalists at the 2019 Pan American Games
Pan American Wrestling Championships medalists
21st-century Puerto Rican women